The Nickel Directive was a European Union directive regulating the use of nickel in jewellery and other products that come into contact with the skin. Since 1 June 2009, it has been subsumed into the REACH Regulation, specifically item 27 of Annex XVII to that regulation. Nevertheless, the term Nickel Directive is still used to refer to the restrictions on nickel usage and the prescribed test method for quantifying nickel release from products EN 1811.

Allergy to nickel is a common cause of contact dermatitis, with roughly 10% of the population in Western Europe and North America being sensitive to nickel. Initial sensitisation frequently occurs from jewellery such as ear studs and other body piercings, and nickel allergy is more prevalent among women than men. Once sensitised, an individual can develop contact dermatitis from shorter term contact with nickel-containing products: this is a particular problem given the use of nickel in coinage, such as the European one- and two-euro coins and the Canadian five-cent piece. This led to moves by two European countries to prevent the initial sensitisation of jewellery wearers by limiting the use of nickel in piercing studs and other products which are in prolonged contact with the skin, and then to the European Union Nickel Directive in 1994.

The Nickel Directive imposes limits on the amount of nickel that may be released from jewellery and other products intended to come into direct and prolonged contact with the skin. These limits, known as migration limits, are:
0.2 µg/cm2/week for post assemblies which are inserted into pierced ears and other pierced parts of the human body;
0.5 µg/cm2/week for other products intended to come into direct and prolonged contact with the skin.
Nickel release is measured by a test method known as EN 1811, which involves placing the object in an artificial sweat solution for one week, then measuring nickel by atomic absorption spectroscopy or any other appropriate technique (e.g. ICP-MS). Other, equivalent test methods may also be accepted. Wear and corrosion can be simulated by a method known as EN 12472.

Notes and references

Notes

References

European Union directives
Directive
Regulation of chemicals in the European Union